Robert Witold Makłowicz (born 12 August 1963) is a Polish food critic, journalist, historian and television personality, notable as a promoter of the Polish cuisine and slow food.

Biography
He was born in 1963 in Kraków to sailor father Włodzimierz and mother Beata (née Preiss). He is of Polish, Armenian, Ukrainian, Hungarian and Austrian descent.

He became fascinated with European cuisine during his studies at the Faculty of History of the Jagiellonian University. After the end of communism in Poland, in 1993, as a joke, he had shown one of his friends a recipe for wiener schnitzel he prepared himself. He was instantly offered the job of a culinary critic of the Kraków variation of the Gazeta Wyborcza daily. Soon afterwards his essays and descriptions of various restaurants in Kraków became so popular that he was moved to the all-national weekly magazine published by Gazeta Wyborcza. He also started cooperation with various other newspapers, including Przekrój, Wprost (2002–2005) and Newsweek Polska (since 2005).

In 1996 he was also offered a short programme in the morning block of the public TV. Although far from prime time, the programme gained much popularity and, since August 1998, Makłowicz has been preparing a weekly show named Robert Makłowicz's Culinary Travels. Each show is prepared in a different region of the world and presents the local cuisine as prepared by Makłowicz himself or by local people, not necessarily professional chefs. In 2016, he appeared on Bake-Off. Ale Ciacho! culinary show broadcast on TVP2 channel.

In 2017 TVP ended cooperation with Makłowicz. His show Makłowicz on the Road is shown on the Polish Food Network.

In 2020 Makłowicz created his own channel on YouTube.

Personal life
He has a younger sister named Dominika. In 1991, he married Agnieszka Pogoda with whom he has two sons: Mikołaj (born 1992) and Ferdynand (born 1996). Makłowicz is Armenian Catholic.

Books
Makłowicz also published a number of books on culinary traditions of his homeland, Galicia. The first of the series, the C.K. Kuchnia (K.u.K. Cuisine) became a nationwide best-seller. Other Robert Makłowicz's books:

 Zjeść Kraków (Eating Cracow, 2001) with Stanisław Mancewicz
 Dialogi języka z podniebieniem (Dialogues of a Tongue with a Palate, 2003) with Piotr Bikont
 Czy wierzyć platynowym blondynkom? (Do You Believe Platinum Blondes?, 2004)
 Kalendarz znaleziony w brytfannie (A Calendar Found in a Baking Tin, 2005)
 Podróże kulinarne Roberta Makłowicza. Smak Węgier (Robert Makłowicz's Culinary Travels. The Tase of Hungary, 2006)
 Stół z niepowyłamywanymi nogami (A Table without Broken legs, 2007) with Piotr Bikont
 Fuzja Smaków. Podróże kulinarne Roberta Makłowicza (The Fusion of Tastes. Robert Makłowicz's Culinary Travels, 2007)
 Cafe Museum (2010)
 Dalmacja. Książka kucharska (Dalmatia. The Cookery Book, 2016)

Filmography
 2023: Asterix & Obelix: The Middle Kingdom'' (voice role)

See also
Magda Gessler

References

External links
  
 
 

Jagiellonian University alumni
Journalists from Kraków
Polish food writers
Polish television chefs
Polish gourmands
Polish people of Armenian descent
Polish people of Austrian descent
Polish people of Hungarian descent
Polish people of Ukrainian descent
1963 births
Living people
Polish YouTubers
Recipients of the Silver Cross of Merit (Poland)
Armenian Catholics
Polish Eastern Catholics
Armenian Christians
Polish writers
Polish television journalists